McCarthy Ridge is a broad, mainly ice-covered ridge with steep sides forming the east wall of Carnein Glacier, in the foothills of southeastern Eisenhower Range, in Victoria Land, Antarctica. It was mapped by the United States Geological Survey from surveys and U.S. Navy air photos, 1955–63, and was named by the Advisory Committee on Antarctic Names for Peter C. McCarthy, biolab manager at McMurdo Station, winter party 1966, under contract with the Northstar Research and Development Institute, Minneapolis, to the National Science Foundation.

References

Ridges of Victoria Land
Scott Coast